The 2023 Virginia House of Delegates election is scheduled to be held on Tuesday, November 7, 2023, concurrently with elections for the Senate of Virginia, to elect members of the 163rd Virginia General Assembly. All 100 delegates are elected to two-year terms single-member districts. Nomination primaries held through the Department of Elections are to be held June 20, 2023.

Background 
Following the 2021 election, Republicans regained control of the House of Delegates that was lost to the Democrats in 2019. They currently hold a narrow majority of 52 seats.

After the 2022 General Assembly session. House Democrats voted via a secret ballot to remove former Speaker and current Minority Leader Eileen Filler-Corn from the top of party leadership. House Democrats would replace Filler-Corn with Don Scott as the new Minority Leader.

The 2023 election will be the first election held under new district maps following redistricting as a result of the 2020 Census. In 2020 voters overwhelmingly approved a Constitutional Amendment to create an independent redistricting committee. This committee would ultimately fail in agreeing on a newly drawn map. The districts delegates will be running in were created by two special masters appointed by the Supreme Court of Virginia.

Retirements
24 incumbents will not seek re-election.

Republicans
Twelve Republicans will not seek re-election.
Distrist 17: Chris Head will retire to run for state senate.
District 28: Tara Durant will retire to run for state senate.
District 33: Dave LaRock will retire to run for state senate.
District 36: John Avoli will retire.
District 49: James E. Edmunds will retire.
District 55: Rob Bell will retire.
District 52: Kathy Byron will retire.
District 56: John McGuire will retire to run for state senate.
District 64: Emily Brewer will retire to run for state senate.
District 67: Margaret Ransone will retire.
District 73: Roxann Robinson will retire.
District 100: Tim Anderson will retire.

Democrats
Twleve Democrats will not seek re-election.
District 7: Kathleen Murphy will retire.
District 7: Ken Plum will retire.
District 13: Danica Roem will retire to run for state senate.
District 18: Eileen Filler-Corn will retire.
District 24: Elizabeth Guzmán will retire to run for state senate.
District 26: Suhas Subramanyam will retire to run for state senate.
District 31: Wendy Gooditis will retire.
District 57: Sally L. Hudson will retire to run for state senate.
District 69: Mike Mullin will retire.
District 71: Jeff Bourne will retire.
District 72: Schuyler VanValkenburg will retire to run for state senate.
District 76: Clint Jenkins will retire to run for state senate.

Special elections
There were three special elections for the 162nd Virginia General Assembly. The first was held on January 11, 2022. The following two were held on January 10, 2023.

District 89
Incumbent Democrat Jay Jones, first elected in 2017, retired on December 31, 2021.

District 24
Incumbent Republican Ronnie R. Campbell, first elected in 2018, died December 13, 2022.

District 35
Incumbent Democrat Mark Keam, first elected in 2009, resigned on September 6, 2022.

Overview

List of districts

District 1
House District 1 contains portions of Arlington County. Incumbent delegate is Democrat Patrick Hope, who was first elected in 2009.

Democratic Primary

Potential
 Patrick Hope, incumbent

District 2
House District 2 contains portions of Arlington County. This is an open seat following redistricting.

Democratic Primary

Declared
 Adele McClure, community activist

Potential
 Kevin Saucedo-Broach, former Chief of Staff for Alfonso Lopez

District 3
House District 3 is located partially within the city of Alexandria and Arlington County. Incumbent delegate is Democrat Alfonso Lopez, who was first elected in 2011.

Democratic Primary

Potential
 Alfonso Lopez, incumbent

District 4
House District 4 is located partially within the city of Alexandria and Fairfax County. Incumbent delegate is Democrat Charniele Herring, who was first elected in 2009.

Democratic Primary

Potential
 Charniele Herring, incumbent

District 5
House District 5 contains portions of the city of Alexandria. Incumbent delegate is Democrat Elizabeth Bennett-Parker, who was first elected in 2021.

Democratic Primary

Declared
 Elizabeth Bennett-Parker, incumbent

District 6
House District 6 contains portions of Fairfax County. This district has two incumbents following redistricting. Democrat Kathleen Murphy, who was first elected in 2015. And Democrat Rip Sullivan, who was first elected in 2014.

Democratic Primary

Declared
 Rip Sullivan, incumbent

Declined
 Kathleen Murphy, incumbent

District 7
House District 7 contains portions of Fairfax County. Incumbent delegate is Democrat Ken Plum, who was first elected in 1981.

Democratic Primary

Declared
 Mary Barthelson, space engineer
 Paul Berry, teacher
 John Farrell, Reston Association Board of Directors member
 Shyamali Hauth, U.S. Air Force veteran
 Karen Keys-Gamarra, Fairfax County School Board member

Declined
 Ken Plum, incumbent delegate.

District 8
House District 8 contains portions of Fairfax County. Incumbent delegate is Democrat Irene Shin, who was first elected in 2021.

Democratic Primary

Declared
 Irene Shin, incumbent

District 9
House District 9 contains portions of Fairfax County. Incumbent delegate is Democrat Karrie Delaney, who was first elected in 2017.

Democratic Primary

Declared
 Karrie Delaney, incumbent

District 10
House District 10 contains portions of Fairfax County. Incumbent delegate is Democrat Dan Helmer, who was first elected in 2019.

Democratic Primary

Potential
 Dan Helmer, incumbent

Republican Primary

Potential
 James Thomas

District 11
House District 11 contains all of the city of Fairfax and portions of Fairfax County. Incumbent delegate is Democrat David Bulova, who was first elected in 2005.

Democratic Primary

Potential
 David Bulova, incumbent

District 12
House District 12 contains portions of Fairfax County. Incumbent delegate is Democrat Holly Seibold, who was first elected in 2023.

Democratic Primary

Potential
 Holly Seibold, incumbent

District 13
House District 13 contains all of the city of Falls Church and portions of Fairfax County. This district has two incumbents following redistricting. Democrat Kaye Kory, who was first elected in 2009. And Democrat Marcus Simon, who was first elected in 2013.

Democratic Primary

Declared
 Marcus Simon, incumbent

Potential
 Kaye Kory, incumbent

District 14
House District 14 contains portions of Fairfax County. Incumbent delegate is Democrat Vivian Watts, who was first elected in 1995.

Democratic Primary

Potential
 Vivian Watts, incumbent

District 15
House District 15 contains portions of Fairfax County. This is an open seat following redistricting.

Democratic Primary

Declared
 Laura Jane Cohen, Fairfax County School Board member
 Henri' Thompson, teacher

District 16
House District 16 contains portions of Fairfax County. Incumbent delegate is Democrat Paul Krizek, who was first elected in 2015.

Democratic Primary

Potential
 Paul Krizek, incumbent

District 17
House District 17 contains portions of Fairfax County. Incumbent delegate is Democrat Mark Sickles, who was first elected in 2003.

Democratic Primary

Potential
 Mark Sickles, incumbent

District 18
House District 18 contains portions of Fairfax County. This district has two incumbents following redistricting. Democrat Eileen Filler-Corn, who was first elected in 2010. And Democrat Kathy Tran, who was first elected in 2017.

Democratic Primary

Declared
 Kathy Tran, incumbent

Declined
 Eileen Filler-Corn, incumbent

District 19
House District 19 contains portions of Fairfax County and Prince William County. This is an open seat following redistricting.

Democratic Primary

Declared
 Rozia Henson, federal contractor
 Makya Little, former FBI employee
 Natalie Shorter, financier and granddaughter of Louise Lucas

District 20
House District 20 contains all of the cities of Manassas and Manassas Park. As well as portions of Prince William County. Incumbent delegate is Democrat Michelle Maldonado, who was first elected in 2021.

Democratic Primary

Potential
 Michelle Maldonado, incumbent

District 21
House District 21 contains portions of Prince William County. This is an open seat following redistricting.

Democratic Primary

Declared
 Josh Thomas, U.S. Marine veteran and attoreny

Republican Primary

Declared
 Josh Quill U.S Marine veteran
 John Stirrup, lobbyist and former Prince William County supervisor

District 22
House District 22 contains portions of Prince William County. This is an open seat following redistricting.

Republican Primary

Declared
 Ian Lovejoy, former Manassas City Councilor and nominee for HD-50 in 2019

Democratic Primary

Potential
 Travis Nembhard, Adjunct Professor at American University

District 23
House District 23 contains portions of Prince William County and Stafford County. Incumbent delegate is Democrat Candi King, who was first elected in 2021.

Democratic Primary

Potential
 Candi King, incumbent

District 24
House District 24 contains portions of Prince William County. This seat has two incumbents following redistricting. Democrat Elizabeth Guzmán, who was first elected in 2017. And Democrat Luke Torian, who was first elected in 2009. Delegate Guzmán announced she would be running for State Senate.

Democratic Primary

Potential
 Luke Torian, incumbent

Declined
 Elizabeth Guzmán, incumbent (running for SD-29)

District 25
House District 25 contains portions of Prince William County. Incumbent delegate is Democrat Briana Sewell, who was first elected in 2021.

Democratic Primary

Declared
 Briana Sewell, incumbent

District 26
House District 26 contains portions of Loudoun County. Incumbent delegate is Democrat Suhas Subramanyam, who was first elected in 2019.

Democratic Primary

Declared
 Kannan Srinivasan, finance professional

Declined
 Suhas Subramanyam, incumbent (running for state senate)

District 27
House District 27 contains portions of Loudoun County. This is an open seat following redistricting.

Democratic Primary

Declared
 Atoosa Reaser, Loudoun County School Board member

Withdrawn
 Kannan Srinivasan, finance professional (Running in HD-26)

Republican Primary

Declared
 Chris Harnisch, former Deputy Coordinator for Counterterrorism at the U.S. State Department

District 28
House District 28 contains portions of Loudoun County. Incumbent delegate is Democrat David A. Reid, who was first elected in 2017

Democratic Primary

Declared
 David A. Reid, incumbent

District 29
House District 29 contains portions of Loudoun County. This is an open seat following redistricting.

Democratic Primary

Declared
 Marty Martinez, Leesburg City Council member

Potential
 Michelle Thomas, pastor

District 30
House District 30 contains portions of Fauquier County and Loudoun County. This is an open seat following redistricting.

Democratic Primary

Declared
 Robert Banse, reverend
 Max Sawicky, economist

Republican Primary

Declared
 Geary Higgins, former Loudoun County supervisor and nominee for SD-13 in 2019
 Caleb Max, businessman and Republican candidate for VA-10 in 2022

District 31
House District 31 contains all of Clarke County and portions of Frederick County and Warren County. Incumbent delegate is Democrat Wendy Gooditis, who was first elected in 2017.

Democratic Primary

Declined
 Wendy Gooditis, incumbent

Republican Primary

Declared
 Delores Riley Oates, Warren County supervisor

District 32
House District 32 contains the entire city of Winchester and portions of Frederick County. Incumbent delegate is Republican Bill Wiley, who was first elected in 2020.

Republican Primary

Declared
 Bill Wiley, incumbent

District 33
House District 33 contains all of Page County and Shenandoah County. As well as portions of Rockingham County and Warren County. Incumbent delegate is Republican Todd Gilbert, who was first elected in 2005.

Republican Primary

Potential
 Todd Gilbert, incumbent

Democratic Primary

Declared
 Bob Smith, U.S. Army veteran

District 34
House District 34 contains the city of Harrisonburg and portions of Rockingham County. Incumbent delegate is Republican Tony Wilt, who was first elected in 2010.

Republican Primary

Potential
 Tony Wilt, incumbent

Democratic Primary

Potential
 Esther Nizer, IT manager

District 35
House District 35 contains all of Bath County and Highland County. As well as portions of Augusta County and Rockingham County. Incumbent delegate is Republican Chris Runion, who was first elected in 2019.

Republican Primary

Potential
 Chris Runion, incumbent

District 36
House District 36 contains the cities of Staunton and Waynesboro. As well as portions of Augusta County and Rockbridge County. This district has two incumbents following redistricting. Republican John Avoli, who was first elected in 2019. And Republican Ronnie R. Campbell, who was first elected in 2018. Delegate Campbell passed away on December 13, 2022 after a fight with cancer.His wife Ellen won the special election to replace him in the General Assembly. Thus is also an incumbent in this seat.

Republican Primary

Potential
 Ellen Campbell, incumbent

Declined
 John Avoli, incumbent.

Democratic Primary

Potential
 Randall Wolf, Democratic nominee for HD-20 in 2021

District 37
House District 37 contains the cities of Buena Vista, Covington, and Lexington. As well as all of Alleghany County, Botetourt County, and Craig County. Also portions of Rockbridge County. Incumbent delegate is Republican Terry Austin, who was first elected in 2013.

Republican Primary

Potential
 Terry Austin, incumbent

District 38
House District 38 contains portions of the city of Roanoke. Incumbent delegate is Democrat Sam Rasoul, who was first elected in 2013.

Democratic Primary

Potential
 Sam Rasoul, incumbent

District 39
House District 39 contains all of Franklin County and portions of Roanoke County. This is an open seat following redistricting.

Republican Primary

Declared
 Will Davis, attorney

Potential
 Ron Jefferson, retired lineman for Appalachian Power

District 40
House District 40 contains the entire city of Salem, portions of the city of Roanoke, and portions of Roanoke County. Incumbent delegate is Republican Joe McNamara, who was first elected in 2018.

Republican Primary

Potential
 Joe McNamara, incumbent

District 41
House District 41 contains portions of Montgomery County and Roanoke County. This is an open seat following redistricting.

Republican Primary

Declared
 Chris Obenshain, Montgomery County assistant commonwealth's attorney
 Lowell Bowman, contractor and Republican candidate for HD-7 in 2021

Democratic Primary

Decalred
 Lily Franklin, Chief of Staff for Sam Rasoul

Withdrawn
 James Harder, Director of CS/root and Democratic nominee for HD-12 in 2013

District 42
House District 42 contains the entire city of Radford and Giles County. As well as portions of Pulaski County and Montgomery County. Incumbent delegate is Republican Jason Ballard, who was first elected in 2021.

Republican Primary

Potential
 Jason Ballard, incumbent
 Jody Pyles, Marketing and Sales Consultant

District 43
House District 43 contains all of Bland County, Buchanan County, and Tazewell County. As well as portions of Dickenson County and Russell County. Incumbent delegate is Republican Will Morefield, who was first elected in 2009.

Republican Primary

Potential
 Will Morefield, incumbent

District 44
House District 44 contains the entire city of Bristol and Washington County. As well as portions of Russell County. This district has two incumbents following redistricting. Republican Israel O'Quinn, who was first elected in 2011. And Republican Will Wampler, who was first elected in 2019.

Republican Primary

Potential
 Israel O'Quinn, incumbent
 Will Wampler, incumbent

District 45
House District 45 contains the entire city of Norton, Lee County, Scott County, and Wise County. As well as portions of Dickenson County. Incumbent Delegate is Republican Terry Kilgore, who was first elected in 1993.

Republican Primary

Potential
 Terry Kilgore, incumbent

District 46
House District 46 contains all of Grayson County, Smyth County, and Wythe County. As well as portions of Pulaski County. Incumbent delegate is Republican Jeff Campbell, who was first elected in 2013.

Republican Primary

Potential
 Jeff Campbell, incumbent

District 47
House District 47 contains the entire city of Galax, Carroll County, Floyd County, and Patrick County. As well as portions of Henry County. This district has two incumbents following redistricting. Republican Marie March, who was first elected in 2021. And Republican Wren Williams, who was also first elected in 2021.

Republican Primary

Declared
 Marie March, incumbent
 Wren Williams, incumbent

District 48
House District 48 contains the entire city of Martinsville. As well as portions of Henry County and Pittsylvania County. Incumbent delegate is Republican Les Adams, who was first elected in 2013.

Republican Primary

Potential
 Les Adams, incumbent

Democratic Primary

Potential
 Chance Trevillian, receptionist and Democratic nominee for HD-16 in 2021

District 49
House District 49 contains the entire city of Danville. As well as portions of Halifax County and Pittsylvania County. This district has two incumbents following redistricting. Republican James E. Edmunds, who was first elected in 2009. And Republican Danny Marshall, who was first elected in 2001. Edmunds is retiring.

Republican Primary

Potential
 Danny Marshall, incumbent

Declined
 James E. Edmunds, incumbent.

District 50
House District 50 contains all of Charlotte County, Lunenburg County, and Mecklenburg County. As well as portions of Halifax County and Prince Edward County. Incumbent delegate is Republican Tommy Wright who was first elected in 2000.

Republican Primary

Potential
 Tommy Wright, incumbent

District 51
House District 51 contains portions of Bedford County, Campbell County, and Pittsylvania County. Incumbent delegate is Republican Matt Fariss, who was first elected in 2011.

Republican Primary

Declared
 Eric Zehr, former Campbell County supervisor

Potential
 Matt Fariss, incumbent

District 52
House District 52 contains the entire city of Lynchburg and portions of Campbell County. This district has two incumbents following redistricting. Republican Kathy Byron, who was first elected in 1997. And Republican Wendell Walker, who was first elected in 2019.

Republican Primary

Potential
 Wendell Walker, incumbent

Declined
 Kathy Byron, incumbent.

District 53
House District 53 contains all of Amherst County. As well as portions of Bedford County and Nelson County. This is an open seat following redistricting.

Republican Primary

Potential
 Tim P Griffin
Sarah E Mays

Democratic Primary

Potential
 Sam Soghor, community activist, Democratic nominee for HD-24 in 2021, and Democratic candidate for the HD-24 special in 2023

District 54
House District 54 contains the entire city of Charlottesville and portions of Albemarle County. This is an open seat following redistricting.

Democratic Primary

Declared
 Bellamy Brown, U.S. Marine veteran
 Katrina Callsen, Albemarle County School Board member
 Dashad Cooper, social services employee
 Dave Norris, former Mayor of Charlottesville

Withdrawn
 David Brown, former Director of the Virginia Department of Health Professions

District 55
House District 55 contains portions of Albemarle County, Fluvanna County, Louisa County, and Nelson County. Incumbent delegate is Republican Rob Bell, who was first elected in 2001.

Republican Primary

Declined
 Rob Bell, incumbent.

Democratic Primary

Declared
 Amy Laufer, former Charlottesville School Board member and Democratic nominee for SD-17 in 2019
 Kellen Squire, emergency room nurse

District 56
House District 56 contains all of Appomattox County, Buckingham County, and Cumberland County. As well as portions of Fluvanna County, Goochland County, Louisa County, and Prince Edward County. This is an open seat following redistricting.

Republican Primary

Declared
 Kevin Bailey, attorney
 Tom Garrett, former U.S. Representative for VA-5
 Jennie Wood, businesswoman

District 57
House District 57 contains portions of Goochland County and Henrico County. This is an open seat following redistricting.

Republican Primary

Declared
 David Owen, businessman

Democratic Primary

Declared
 Bob Shippee, financial expert, environmental & reproductive rights advocate 
 Susanna Gibson, nurse

District 58
House District 58 contains potions of Henrico County. Incumbent delegate is Democrat Rodney Willett, who was first elected in 2019.

Democratic Primary

Potential
 Rodney Willett, incumbent

Republican Primary

Potential
Riley Saia, fitness instructor

District 59
House District 59 contains portions of Hanover County, Henrico County, and Louisa County. Incumbent delegate is Republican Buddy Fowler, who was first elected in 2013.

Republican Primary

Declared
 Graven Craig, attorney and Republican candidate for HD-56 in 2017
 Buddy Fowler, incumbent
 Philip Strother, attorney

Democratic Primary

Declared
 Rachel Levy, teacher and Democratic nominee for HD-55 in 2021

District 60
House District 60 contains portions of Hanover County and New Kent County. Incumbent delegate is Republican Scott Wyatt, who was first elected in 2019.

Republican Primary

Potential
 Scott Wyatt, incumbent

District 61
House District 61 contains all of Rappahannock County and portions of Culpeper County and Fauquier County. Incumbent delegate is Republican Michael Webert, who was first elected in 2011.

Republican Primary

Declared
 Michael Webert. incumbent

District 62
House District 62 contains all of Greene County and Madison County. As well as portions of Culpeper County and Orange County. Incumbent delegate is Republican Nick Freitas, who was first elected in 2015.

Republican Primary

Declared
 Nick Freitas, incumbent

Democratic Primary

Declared
 Sara Ratcliffe, consultant and Democratic nominee for HD-58 in 2021

District 63
House District 63 contains portions of Orange County and Spotsylvania County. Incumbent delegate is Republican Philip Scott, who was first elected in 2021.

Republican Primary

Potential
 Philip Scott, incumbent

District 64
House District 64 contains portions of Stafford County. This is an open seat following redistricting,

Republican Primary

Declared
 Paul Milde. former Stafford County supervisor and Republican nominee for HD-28 in 2019

Democratic Primary

Potential
 Leonard Lacey, bishop

District 65
House District 65 contains the entire city of Fredericksburg and portions of Spotsylvania County and Stafford County. This is an open seat following redistricting.

Democratic Primary

Potential
 Joshua G. Cole, former delegate

Republican Primary

Potential
 Michael Kasey, disability advocate
 Lee Peters, III, Lieutenant for the Stafford County sheriff's office

District 66
House District 66 contains portions of Caroline County and Spotsylvania County. Incumbent delegate is Republican Bobby Orrock, who was first elected in 1989.

Republican Primary

Declared
 Bobby Orrock, incumbent

District 67
House District 67 contains all of King George County, Lancaster County, Northumberland County, Richmond County, and Westmoreland County. As well as portions of Caroline County. Incumbent delegate is Republican Margaret Ransone, who was first elected in 2011.

Republican Primary

Declared
Hillary Pugh Kent, businesswoman

Declined
 Margaret Ransone, incumbent Delegate.

District 68
House District 68 contains all of Essex County, King & Queen County, King William County, Mathews County, and Middlesex County. As well as portions of Gloucester County. Incumbent delegate is Republican Keith Hodges, who was first elected in 2011.

Republican Primary

Potential
 Keith Hodges, incumbent

District 69
House District 69 contains portions of the city of Newport News, Gloucester County, James City County, and York County. Incumbent delegate is Democrat Michael P. Mullin, who was first elected in 2016.

Democratic Primary

Declined
 Michael P. Mullin, incumbent.

Republican Primary

Declared
 Chad Green, York County supervisor

District 70
House District 70 contains portions of the city of Newport News. Incumbent delegate is Democrat Shelly Simonds, who was first elected in 2019.

Democratic Primary

Potential
 Shelly Simonds, incumbent

District 71
House District 71 contains all of the city of Williamsburg. As well as portions of James City County and New Kent County. Incumbent delegate is Republican Amanda Batten, who was first elected in 2019.

Republican Primary

Potential
 Amanda Batten, incumbent

Democratic Primary

Potential
 Jessica Anderson, receptionist

District 72
House District 72 contains all of Amelia County, Nottoway County, and Powhatan County. As well as portions of Chesterfield County. Incumbent delegate is Republican Lee Ware, who was first elected in 1998.

Republican Primary

Potential
 Lee Ware, incumbent

Democratic Primary

Potential
 Bilal Zoulfikar Raychouni

District 73
House District 73 contains portions of Chesterfield County. Incumbent delegate is Republican Roxann Robinson, who was first elected in 2010.

Republican Primary

Declared
 Mark Earley Jr, attorney and Republican nominee for HD-68 in 2021
 Ryan Harter, Chesterfield County School Board member

Potential
 Yan Gleyzer, e-cigarette distributor

Declined
 Roxann Robinson, incumbent.

District 74
House District 74 contains the entire city of Colonial Heights and portions of Chesterfield County. Incumbent delegate is Republican Mike Cherry, who was first elected in 2021.

Republican Primary

Potential
 Mike Cherry, incumbent

District 75
House District 75 contains all of the city of Hopewell and portions of Chesterfield County and Prince George County. Incumbent delegate is Republican Carrie Coyner, who was first elected in 2019.

Republican Primary

Potential
 Carrie Coyner, incumbent

District 76
House District 76 contains portions of Chesterfield County. This is an open seat following redistricting.

Democratic Primary

Potential
 Debra Gardner, public service employee and Democratic nominee for HD-27 in 2021

District 77
House District 77 contains portions of the city of Richmond and Chesterfield County. This is an open seat following redistricting.

Democratic Primary

Declared
 Michael Jones, Richmond City Council member

District 78
House District 78 contains portions of the city of Richmond. This seat has three incumbents following redistricting. Democrat Dawn Adams, who was first elected in 2017, Democrat Jeff Bourne, who was also first elected in 2017, and Democrat Betsy Carr, who was first elected in 2009.

Democratic Primary

Potential
 Betsy Carr, incumbent

Declined
 Dawn Adams, incumbent
 Jeff Bourne, incumbent

District 79
House District 79 contains portions of the city of Richmond. This is an open seat following redistricting.

Democratic Primary

Declared
 Rae Cousins, attorney
 Ann Lambert, Richmond City Council member

Potential
 Richard Walker, mental health professional

District 80
House District 80 contains portions of Henrico County. Incumbent delegate is Democrat Lamont Bagby, who was first elected in 2015.

Democratic Primary

Potential
 John Dantzler, Democratic candidate for HD-74 in 2021

Declined
 Lamont Bagby, incumbent

District 81
House District 81 contains all of Charles City County and portions of Henrico County and Chesterfield County. Incumbent delegate is Democrat Delores McQuinn, who was first elected in 2009.

Democratic Primary

Declared
 Terrence Walker, administrative assistant

Potential
 Delores McQuinn, incumbent

District 82
House District 82 contains the entire of the city of Petersburg and Surry County. As well as portions of Dinwiddie County and Prince George County. Incumbent delegate is Republican Kim Taylor, who was first elected in 2021.

Republican Primary

Potential
 Kim Taylor, incumbent

Democratic Primary

Declared
 Kimberly Pope Adams, auditor
 Victor McKenzie, nonprofit executive director

Potential
 Branden Riley

District 83
House District 83 contains all of the city of Emporia, Brunswick County. Greensville County, Southampton County, and Sussex County. As well as portions of Dinwiddie County and Isle of Wight County. Incumbent delegate is Republican Otto Wachsmann, who was first elected in 2021.

Republican Priamry

Potential
 Otto Wachsmann, incumbent

Democratic Primary

Potential
 Mary Person

District 84
House District 84 contains all of the city of Franklin. As well as portions of the city of Suffolk and Isle of Wight County. Incumbent delegate is Democrat Nadarius Clark, who was first elected in 2021.

Democratic Primary

Declared
 Michele Joyce, computer scientist and Democratic nominee for HD-64 in 2019

Potential
 Nadarius Clark, incumbent

Republican Primary

Declared
 Michael Dillender, U.S. Navy veteran and Republican nominee for HD-76 in 2021
 Rod Thompson, U.S. Navy veteran

District 85
House District 85 contains portions of the city of Newport News. Incumbent delegate is Democrat Cia Price, who was first elected in 2015.

Democratic Primary

Potential
 Cia Price, incumbent

District 86
House District 86 contains the entire city of Poquoson. As well as portions of the city of Hampton and York County. Incumbent delegate is Republican A.C. Cordoza, who was first elected in 2021.

Republican Primary

Potential
 A.C. Cordoza, incumbent

Democratic Primary
 Ron Lee

District 87
House District 87 contains portions of the city of Hampton. Incumbent delegate is Democrat Jeion Ward, who was first elected in 2003.

Democratic Primary

Potential
 Jeion Ward, incumbent

District 88
House District 88 contains portions of the city of Portsmouth. Incumbent delegate is Democrat Don Scott, who was first elected in 2019.

Democratic Primary

Potential
 Don Scott, incumbent

District 89
House District 89 contains portions of the cities of Chesapeake and Suffolk. This is an open seat following redistricting.

Republican Primary

Declared
 Don Carey, Chesapeake City Council member and former NFL player

Potential
 Baxter Ennis, U.S Army veteran
 Jason Wooldrige

Democratic Primary

Potential
 Karen Lynette Jenkins, Suffolk School Board member

District 90
House District 90 contains portions of the city of Chesapeake. Incumbent delegate is Republican Jay Leftwich, who was first elected in 2013.

Republican Primary

Potential
 Jay Leftwich, incumbent

District 91
House District 91 contains portions of the cities of Chesapeake and Portsmouth. Incumbent delegate is Democrat Cliff Hayes Jr., who was first elected in 2016.

Democratic Primary

Potential
 Cliff Hayes Jr., incumbent

District 92
House District 92 contains portions of the cities of Chesapeake and Norfolk. This is an open seat following redistricting.

Democratic Primary

Potential
 Bonita Anthony, executive director and candidate for Norfolk School Board in 2018.
 Kim Sudderth, senior manager

District 93
House District 93 contains portions of the city of Norfolk. Incumbent delegate is Jackie Glass, who was first elected in 2022.

Democratic Primary

Potential
 Jackie Glass, incumbent

Republican Primary

Potential
 John Sitka, III, U.S Navy veteran

District 94
House District 94 contains portions of the city of Norfolk. This is an open seat following redistricting.

Democratic Primary

Declared
 Phil Hernandez, nonprofit vice president and Democratic nominee for HD-100 in 2019
 Mike Pudhorodsky, activist

Republican Primary

Potential
 Amy Chudzinski, attoney
 Kenneth O'Brein, U.S. Navy veteran
 Andrew B Pittman, attorney
 Antonio Respass

District 95
House Distrcit 95 contains portions of the cities of Norfolk and Virginia Beach. This is an open seat following redistricting.

Democratic Primary

Potential
 Alex Askew, former delegate
 Rick James,

District 96
House District contains portions of the city of Virginia Beach. This is an open seat following redistricting.

Democratic Primary

Potential
 Susan Hippen, U.S. Navy veteran
 Brandon Hutchins, U.S. Navy veteran and candidate for Virginia Beach City Council in 2020.
 Sean Monteiro, realtor

District 97
House District 97 contains portions of the city of Virginia Beach. Incumbent delegate is Republican Karen Greenhalgh, who was first elected in 2021.

Republican Primary

Potential
 Karen Greenhalgh, incumbent

Democratic Primary

Potential
 Michael Feggans, U.S. Air Force veteran

District 98
House District 98 contains portions of the city of Virginia Beach. This seat has two incumbents following redistricting. Republican Glenn Davis, who was first elected in 2013. And Republican Barry Knight, who was first elected in 2008.

Republican Primary

Potential
 Glenn Davis, incumbent
 Barry Knight, incumbent

Democratic Primary

Declared
 Zachary Coltrain, university student

District 99
House District 99 contains portions of thee city of Virginia Beach. Incumbent delegate is Anne Ferrell Tata, who was first elected in 2021.

Republican Primary

Potential
 Anne Ferrell Tata, incumbent

Democratic Primary

Potential
Melissa Lukeson, businesswoman

District 100
House District 100 contains portions of the city of Virginia Beach. As well as all of Accomack County and Northampton County. This district has two incumbents following redistricting. Republican Tim Anderson, who was first elected in 2021. And Republican Robert Bloxom Jr., who was first elected in 2014. However Anderson has announced he will not seek re-election.

Republican Primary

Potential
 Robert Bloxom Jr., incumbent

Declined
 Tim Anderson, incumbent delegate.

See also 
 2023 United States state legislative elections
 2023 Virginia Senate election

References 

Virginia House of Delegates
House of Delegates
Virginia House of Delegates elections